is a Japanese voice actress affiliated with Haikyo. Her best-known role is Ryoma Echizen, the title character in The Prince of Tennis anime series. She sang some of the show's theme songs, insert songs, and character singles, some of which have charted in Oricon's single rankings. Other major roles include  Ayaka Yukihiro in the Negima series, Akira in Aria, Cao Chun Yan in Fighting Beauty Wulong, Cornelia Li Britannia in Code Geass, Khamsin in Shakugan no Shana, Yoshitaka Nakabayashi in He Is My Master, Haruka Tenoh/Sailor Uranus in Sailor Moon Crystal, Mereoleona Vermillion in Black Clover, and Yun in Yona of the Dawn.

Biography

Before becoming a voice actor
During childhood, Junko actively participated in school plays. In kindergarten, she plays the difficult role of a duck in The Ugly Duckling, and in elementary school, she was in Kaguya-hime.

During junior and senior high school, Junko devoted herself to volleyball club activities. While practicing volleyball, coaching was very strict and there was no break. She soon retired from volleyball because the excessive practices were undermining her social life. Her experiences in these club activities were beneficially healthy both mentally and physically, though, the training was tiring. After graduating high school, looked towards work outside of Japan and becoming a stewardesses. Junko attended an English vocational school to become a stewardess, but she neglected her studies and did not attend classes, so no airline would accept her.

After that, Junko got a job at a regular company. The social interactions at the company was enjoyable, but from the thought of doing the same job for the rest of her life scared her, and she tried to do what she dreamt of doing her whole life; she decided to become an actress. Initially, she tried to join the theater training program, shortly gave up due to financial difficulties such as tuition and living expenses. During her search, she found a voice actor training facility. At first, she liked manga and animation, but then became interested in voice acting and was recruited by the Tohokushinsha Film Company.

After becoming a voice actor
Junko's debut as a voice actor was in a radio commercial for a hairdressing company. Her first job as a voice actor in an Anime was in a show called Soreike! Anpanman where she played the role of a decal. After 3 months of working for Haka-kyo, she found a voice acting job for a game called Tokimeki Memorial 3 released for the PlayStation 2 where she played the role of Shinrikyo Seika. In 2001, she appeared on TV as Ryoma Echizen, the protagonist of a TV anime called The Prince of Tennis. When Junko was accepted to play Ryoma's role, she was so excited, and it was said that it was a miracle that an unnamed newcomer received the main character of the Weekly Shōnen Jump. Playing the role of Ryoma's had a big influence on Junko; she says playing that role changed her life an actress, and it has shaped who she is now. The original Manga author, Takeshi Konomi, says that Junko has become Ryoma herself, and that Ryoma was being played exactly as portrayed in the Manga. Ryoma Echizen has continued playing seamlessly for more than 10 years since the debut in 2001.

Live Activity
Junko has also released CDs of original songs performed at live events. On August 18, 2004 she performed as a live Ryoma Echizen at Zepp Tokyo.

Filmography

Animation

Anime film

OVA
 Code Geass: Akito the Exiled (2012), Shin Hyuuga (young)
 Akatsuki no Yona: Sono se Niwa (2015), Yun
 Pandora Hearts: Oz Vessalius (2009-2010)

Vomic
 World Trigger (2014), Yūma Kuga

Video games

Overseas dubbing

Discography
Drama CD

Other recordings
 Minna Genki''  by Junko Minagawa, Ryo Hirohashi and Friends

Singles

Character singles

Albums

Character albums

Compilation albums

References

External links
 Official agency profile 
 Official website (archive) 
 Junko Minagawa at Ryu's Seiyuu Info
 

Living people
Japanese video game actresses
Japanese voice actresses
Tokyo Actor's Consumer's Cooperative Society voice actors
Voice actresses from Ibaraki Prefecture
21st-century Japanese actresses
Year of birth missing (living people)